Alois Holík (born 23 September 1947) is a Czech former cyclist. He competed for Czechoslovakia in the individual road race at the 1972 Summer Olympics.

References

External links
 
 

1947 births
Living people
Czech male cyclists
Olympic cyclists of Czechoslovakia
Cyclists at the 1972 Summer Olympics
People from Fryšták
Sportspeople from the Zlín Region